The 1997 Toray Pan Pacific Open was a tennis tournament played on indoor carpet court at the Tokyo Metropolitan Gymnasium in Tokyo in Japan that was part of Tier I of the 1997 WTA Tour. It was the 22nd edition of the tournament and was held from 28 January through 2 February 1997. Second-seeded Martina Hingis won the singles title.  She won by walkover as her opponent, Steffi Graf, withdrew before the final match citing a knee injury.

Finals

Singles

 Martina Hingis defeated  Steffi Graf by walkover
 It was Hingis' 4th title of the year and the 9th of her career.

Doubles

 Lindsay Davenport /  Natasha Zvereva defeated  Gigi Fernández /  Martina Hingis 6–4, 6–3
 It was Davenport's 1st title of the year and the 19th of her career. It was Zvereva's 2nd title of the year and the 64th of her career.

References

External links
 ITF tournament edition details

Toray Pan Pacific Open
Pan Pacific Open
Toray Pan Pacific Open
Toray Pan Pacific Open
1997 Toray Pan Pacific Open
Toray Pan Pacific Open
Toray Pan Pacific Open